Central Junior High School may refer to a number of middle schools:

 Central Junior High School, Belleville, Illinois, part of Belleville School District 118
 Central Junior High School, Camp Point, Illinois, part of Central Community Unit School District 3
 Central Junior High School, Cape Girardeau, Missouri, part of Cape Girardeau School District
 Central Junior High School, East Peoria, Illinois, part of East Peoria School District 86
 Central Junior High School, Euless, Texas, part of Hurst-Euless-Bedford Independent School District
 Central Junior High School, Evergreen Park, Illinois, part of Evergreen Park Elementary School District 124
 Central Junior High School, Guymon, Oklahoma, part of Guymon Public Schools
 Central Junior High School, Lawton, Oklahoma, part of Lawton Public Schools
 Central Junior High School, Moore, Oklahoma, part of Moore Public Schools
 Central Junior High School, Pollok, Texas, part of Central Independent School District
 Central Junior High School, Springdale, Arkansas, part of Springdale Public Schools
 Central Junior High School, West Frankfort, Illinois, part of Frankfort Community Unit School District 168
 Central Junior High School, Zion, Illinois, part of Zion Elementary School District 6
 A-C Central Junior High School, Chandlerville, Illinois, part of A-C Central Community Unit School District 262
 Buffalo Island Central Junior High School, Leachville, Arkansas, part of Buffalo Island Central School District
 Corydon Central Junior High School, Corydon, Indiana, part of South Harrison Community Schools
 Farmington Central Junior High School, Farmington, Illinois, part of Farmington Central Community Unit School District 265
 Lawrence Central Junior High School, Lawrence, Kansas, part of Lawrence Unified School District 497
 Pearl River Central Junior High School, Carriere, Mississippi, part of Pearl River County School District
 Warren Central Junior High School, Vicksburg, Mississippi, part of Vicksburg-Warren School District
 Weld Central Junior High School, Keenesburg, Colorado, part of Keenesburg School District Re-3 (J)
 Wilson Central Junior High School, West Lawn, Pennsylvania, part of Wilson School District

See also 
 Central High School (disambiguation)
 Central Middle School (disambiguation)